Cupid Angling was a 1918 silent film starring Ruth Roland, and was the only feature film photographed using the Douglass Natural Color process.

The film was produced by Leon F. Douglass's National Color Film Company in the Lake Lagunitas area of Marin County, California, and was made in the Douglass Natural Color process.  Douglass was also a partner in the founding of the Victor Talking Machine Company. The film stars Ruth Roland and Albert Morrison, and has walk-on appearances by Mary Pickford and Douglas Fairbanks.

This film is now considered a lost film.

References

External links

1918 films
1910s color films
1918 lost films
Silent American drama films
American silent feature films
Films shot in California
Silent films in color
1918 drama films
Lost American films
Early color films
Lost drama films
1910s American films